This is a list of notable people from Lima, Peru. It includes people who were born/raised in, lived in, or spent portions of their lives in Lima, or for whom Lima is a significant part of their identity, as well as music groups founded in Lima. This list is in alphabetical order.

Notable people

Artists and designers 
 Federico Otero, industrial designer, born in Lima
 Felipe Lettersten (1957–2003), artist and sculptor of indigenous tribes and people, died in Lima
 Luis de Riaño (1596–c. 1667), Cusco School painter, born in Lima

Religious
Jacinto Barrasa, 17th-century Jesuit preacher and historian
Saint Martin of Porras, Afro-Peruvian Dominican friar
Saint Rose of Lima, first Roman Catholic saint, born in the Americas

Politicians
Fernando Belaúnde, President of Peru (1963–1968 and 1980–1985)
Javier Pérez de Cuéllar, former Secretary-General of the UN
Alan García, President of Peru (1985–1990 and 2006–2011)
Pedro Pablo Kuczynski, President of Peru (2016–2018)
Daniel Hannan, Member of European Parliament
Jim Himes, US Representative
Luis Felipe de Las Casas Grieve (1916–1988), politician and engineer
Diego de Peñalosa (1621–1687) Governor of Spanish New Mexico in 1661–1664
Javier Valle Riestra, lawyer and politician
Antonieta Zevallos de Prialé (1918/1919–2006), politician

Photographers
Mario Testino, photographer 
Martín Chambi, photographer, from Puno, Peru

Writers
Jaime Bayly, writer, journalist and media personality
Samuel Brejar, poet
Alfredo Bryce, novelist
Alex Kuczynski, writer and author
María Emma Mannarelli, feminist writer, historian and professor
Óscar Miró Quesada de la Guerra (a.k.a. Racso), scientific journalist
Ricardo Palma, poet, novelist and short story writer
Julio Ramón Ribeyro, short story writer and novelist

Musicians

Folk and classical musicians
Felipe Pinglo Alva, considered the father of Peruvian folk music ("musica criolla")
Eva Ayllón, Afro-Peruvian folk singer
Susana Baca, Grammy Award-winning folk singer
Arturo "Zambo" Cavero, folk singer
Juan Diego Florez, tenor vocalist
Jimmy Lopez, composer
Lucha Reyes, folk singer
Nicomedes Santa Cruz, Afro-Peruvian folk singer and poet

Contemporary musicians
Ádammo, rock-pop band
Arena Hash, pop band
Cementerio Club, indie pop band
Mar de Copas, indie pop band
Juan Diego Flores, tenor
Frágil, progressive rock band
Gian Marco, pop singer and composer
Immortal Technique, hip hop artist
Líbido, rock band
Christian Meier, pop singer and actor
Beth Rowley, English singer-songwriter
Pedro Suárez Vértiz, pop singer
Thes One, Christopher Portugal, MC and producer of People Under The Stairs
TK, rock-pop band
Uchpa, rock and blues band

Sports
 Teófilo Cubillas, football (soccer) player
 Tony DeSouza, professional mixed martial artist
 Jefferson Farfán, football (soccer) player
 Raul Geller (born 1936), Peruvian-Israeli football (soccer) player
 Paolo Guerrero, football (soccer) player
 Luis Horna, tennis player
 Jesús Luzardo, baseball player
 Natalia Málaga, volleyball player
 Kina Malpartida, super featherweight class boxing world champion
 David Mejía, football (soccer) player
 Sofia Mulanovich, world champion surfer
 Juan Manuel Vargas, football (soccer) player
 Claudio Pizarro, football (soccer) player
 Nolberto Solano, football (soccer) player
 Cecilia Tait, volleyball player
 Jaime Yzaga, tennis player

Other
 Gastón Acurio (born 1967), chef
 Manuel Buchwald, geneticist
 Juan Jose Cabezudo, chef
 José Eusebio de Llano Zapata (1721–1780), scholar, writer and scientist
 Carmen Olmedo (1909-1985), actress, dancer, songwriter and vedette
 Pedro Pablo Nakada Ludeña, serial killer
 Diana Quijano, actress
 Paddington Brown, bear
 Ricardo Rossel (1841–1909), author, poet, politician, scholar and entrepreneur

 

Lima
People